Besòs Mar is a station in the Barcelona Metro, in La Mina, an area of the Sant Martí district of Barcelona. It's served by L4. It's located underneath carrer d'Alfons el Magnànim between carrer de Lluís Borrassà and carrer de Ferrer Bassa.

Services

See also
List of Barcelona Metro stations

External links
Trenscat.com

Transport in Sant Martí (district)
Barcelona Metro line 4 stations